The Boca Raton is a luxury resort and club in Boca Raton, Florida, founded in 1926, today comprising 1,047 hotel rooms across 337 acres. Its facilities include two 18-hole golf courses, a 50,000 sq. ft. spa, seven swimming pools, 30 tennis courts, a full-service 32-slip marina, 13 restaurants and bars, and 200,000 sq. ft. of meeting space.  The property fronts both Lake Boca (part of the Intracoastal Waterway) and the Atlantic Ocean. The resort was operated as part of Hilton's Waldorf Astoria Hotels and Resorts, and it is owned by an affiliate of MSD Partners.

History
The resort first opened on February 6, 1926, as the 100-room Ritz-Carlton Cloister Inn. Originally designed and built by Boca Raton's city planner, architect Addison Mizner, who intended Camino Real to be the main street of his new city, it was to have been one of two hotels, with the other being an oceanfront hotel. However, the Ritz-Carlton Investment Corporation became involved in the project and wanted the oceanfront hotel redesigned, so construction began on the smaller and financially more viable 100-room inn on the west side of Lake Boca Raton.

Mizner's development company, hurt by the end of the Florida land boom of the 1920s and the 1926 Miami hurricane, declared bankruptcy in 1926. Philadelphia utility millionaire Clarence H. Geist bought its assets in 1927, and he expanded the Cloister Inn into the Boca Raton Club. The architectural firm Schultze and Weaver doubled the inn's size, and a cabana club was constructed where the "Addison on the Ocean" condominium building now stands.

Subsequently, the U.S. Army used the club as barracks during World War II. Touted by officials as "the most elegant barracks in history," it housed soldiers during the Boca Raton Army Air Field's operation.

After the war, the Boca Raton Club's ownership and ultimately name were changed. The Schine family purchased the club in 1944, renaming it the Boca Hotel and Club. While it was affectionately known on brochures as The Boca Raton, the resort was part of the identical Schine portfolio which included the Biltmore Hotel in Coral Gables and the McAllister Hotel in Miami.

Arthur Vining Davis, whose brainchild was the Arvida Corporation, was responsible for modernizing the hotel. Opening the Boca Raton Club Tower in 1969, the building is still considerably taller than any other building in southern Palm Beach County. In addition, its famous "Boca pink" color has made it more famous than its stature of 300 feet (ninety-one meters) and twenty-seven floors, and it is commonly referred to as the "pink hotel". Arvida also constructed the resort's beach club in 1980, on the site that Mizner had intended the main hotel to stand on.

VMS Realty, Incorporated (Van Kampen, Morris, Stone), the successors to Arvida regarding ownership, purchased the property in 1983 and renamed it in 1988 as the Boca Raton Resort & Club.

In 2004, The Blackstone Group, a private investment firm, acquired the resort as part of its $1.25-billion acquisition of Boca Resorts, Inc., the publicly-traded owner and operator of five Florida resorts. In February 2009, the Beach Club finished a $150 million renovation, while the cloister and tower rooms were redesigned in 2006.

MSD Partners L.P., led by Michael Dell, purchased the Boca Raton Resort & Club on June 4, 2019. The new owners, as of 2020, have made a proposal to invest $75 million for renovations to the hotel, restaurants, and amenities. As of July 12, 2021, the resort was renamed as The Boca Raton Cloister.

Gallery

References

External links

History regarding the club
Real estate at the Boca Resort

Hotels in Florida
Resorts in Florida
Golf clubs and courses in Florida
Buildings and structures in Boca Raton, Florida
Hotels in Palm Beach County, Florida
Mediterranean Revival architecture in Florida
Hotel buildings completed in 1926
Hotels established in 1926
Addison Mizner buildings
Tourist attractions in Palm Beach County, Florida
1926 establishments in Florida
Hotels in Boca Raton, Florida